Dew Drop Inn is a musical with music by Alfred Goodman, lyrics by Cyrus Wood, and a book by Walter DeLeon and Edward Delaney Dunn. While Goodman was the principal composer for the work, composers Rudolf Friml, John Frederick Coots, and Jean Schwartz also contributed songs to the show in collaboration with lyricist McElbert Moore. 

Produced by Jacob J. Shubert and directed by Fred G. Latham, the musical premiered on Broadway at the Astor Theatre on May 17, 1923, where it ran until August 25, 1923 for a total of 88 performances. The cast included James Barton, Alice Brady, Spencer Charters, Harry Clark, Danny Dare,  William Holden, Marcella Swanson and Mabel Withee.

References

External links
 

1923 musicals
Broadway musicals